Arda Okan Kurtulan (born 19 November 2002) is an Albanian professional footballer who plays as a winger for Karacabey Belediyespor on loan from  Adana Demirspor. Born in Turkey, he is a youth international for Albania.

Career
Kurtulan was a youth product of Akşemsettin Parsellerspor in 2014 and had a stint with Göktürk Sarayspor in 2015 before returning to his first club. He moved to Erokspor's youth academy in 2017, and then joined Fenerbahçe's youth side in 2019. On 17 May 2021, he signed his first professional contract with Fenerbahçe for three years. He made his professional debut with Fenerbahçe as a late substitute in a 5–0 Süper Lig win over Yeni Malatyaspor on 21 May 2022.

International career
Born and raised in Turkey, Kurtulan is of Albanian descent through his grandparents, respectively from Brest (grandfather), and Mitrovica (grandmother). He was eligible to represent four countries on international level, either Albania, Kosovo, Turkey or North Macedonia with the latter he was part of the U19 and U21 teams and he with these teams played eleven matches and scored two goals.

On 10 November 2022, Kurtulan decided to represent Albania U21 and accept their call-up for the friendly matches against San Marino and Montenegro. His debut with Albania U21 came ten days after call-up in a friendly match against Montenegro after coming on as a substitute at 81st minute in place of Behar Ismaili.

Personal life
Kurtulan's father, Ramazan Kurtulan, was a semi-professional footballer who played in the TFF First League.

References

External links
 
 
 

2002 births
Living people
Footballers from Istanbul
Macedonian footballers
North Macedonia youth international footballers
Turkish footballers
Macedonian people of Turkish descent
Turkish people of Macedonian descent
Association football wingers
Fenerbahçe S.K. footballers
Adana Demirspor footballers
Karacabey Belediyespor footballers
Süper Lig players
TFF Second League players